David Adkisson may refer to:

 David Von Erich, real name David Alan Adkisson, (1958–1984), professional wrestler
 Jim David Adkisson, perpetrator of the 2008 Knoxville Unitarian Universalist church shooting

See also
Adkisson (surname)